What's Important to Me is the 17th album by Ben E. King, released in 1991. King's first studio album in four years produced the singles "What's Important to Me" and "You've Got All of Me".

Track listing
All tracks composed by Ben E. King, except where indicated.
"It's Your Love (That Makes Me Happy)" (King, William Bush, Rita Saunders) – 4:51
"You've Got All of Me" – 2:06
"Major Malfunction" (King, William Bush, Rita Saunders) – 4:47
"You Still Move Me" (Dan Seals) – 5:03
"She's Gone Again" – 4:11
"So Important to Me" (King, Rita Saunders) – 4:32
"You Can Count on Me" (William Stuckley) – 4:16
"It's All Right" (Curtis Mayfield) – 4:12
"I'm Gonna Be Somebody" – 3:59

1991 albums
Ben E. King albums